Montenegro competed as an independent nation at the Winter Olympic Games for the first time at the 2010 Winter Olympics in Vancouver, British Columbia, Canada.

Alpine skiing 

Bojan Kosić is a Montenegrin alpine skier. Kosic was the first representative of Montenegro for the Winter Olympics. He is known to be one of the best skiers Montenegro has ever had in recent years, and of all time.
He was the sole competitor for Montenegro at the 2010 Winter Olympics. Kosić finished 40th in the men's slalom event with the time of 1:55.32. He then finished 61st in the men's giant slalom event with the time of 2:58.03. Kosić did not earn any medals during the 2010 Winter Olympics. In 2011 Kosić survived a near fatal car crash resulting in serious head injuries and internal bleeding. In 2014, Kosić successfully returned to skiing.

References

Nations at the 2010 Winter Olympics
2010
2010 in Montenegrin sport